Ottawa Technical High School, known as Ottawa Tech, was a high school in Ottawa, Canada that specialized in vocational programs. The school opened in 1913 as the second public secondary school in Ottawa, and closed in 1992. It was located on Albert Street in the western part of downtown Ottawa.

History

The building was previously home to a women's college, and Ottawa Tech moved there in 1916. The school originally offered both standard high school programs and courses in auto mechanics, electricity, drafting, computers, and graphic arts. The original building was expanded several times and a new structure was built across the street in the 1960s, with a bright orange walkway connecting the buildings over Slater Street. 

The school expanded its range of courses in the 1950s and 1960s under principal Leo McCarthy, and at its peak in this era had around 1,600 students, attracting students from around the city of Ottawa. The school dropped the compulsory study of Latin and offered pre-engineering courses combining high-level academic courses with technical courses such as electronics and machine shops, as well as the option for intensive music studies. After winning provincial and national honours at the Kiwanis Music Festival Band Competitions in Toronto, Ontario, in 1962, the Ottawa Technical High School band recorded an album, and became the first Canadian high-school band to embark on a European Tour in the summer of 1963, funded by KLM, Royal Dutch Airlines.

Beginning in the 1970s, with the growth in population of the City of Ottawa and the accelerating decentralization of education drawing students to the newer suburban schools, Ottawa Tech, along with several other schools in the city centre, began to drop in enrollment. Although the school continued training students in skilled trades, during the 1970s the academic side diminished, until only 10% of students were continuing to university. Due to the expansion of immigration into Ottawa, some 30% of the students enrolling at Ottawa Tech were studying English as a Second Language. As in the surrounding community, Ottawa Tech experienced linguistic and racial divisions within its population, which further reduced enrollment. In the early 1980s the school was heavily renovated, and in 1984 the High School of Commerce was closed and its business programs were transferred to Ottawa Tech. However, these changes did not reverse declining student numbers; by the early 1990s enrollment fell to 450 students and the 1991–1992 school year saw only 40 new students. The Ottawa Board of Education decided to close the school in May 1992.

The five-acre (20,000 m2) campus now houses many different tenants offering training and 2 high school programs. The TFO series Science Point Com is filmed in the empty classrooms. Despite pressure to sell the buildings, which in 1999 were valued at over $10 million, the site is still owned by the board of education. On June 9, 2009, local media reported that the site may be chosen as a location for a new downtown branch of the Ottawa Public Library.

References

Keith, Janet. The Collegiate Institute Board of Ottawa: A Short History, 1843-1969. Ottawa: Kent, 1969.
Universite d'Ottawa, S.O. 1965, C. 137, Part II, paragraph 9(b).

Defunct schools in Ottawa
Educational institutions established in 1913
Educational institutions disestablished in 1992
1913 establishments in Ontario
1992 disestablishments in Ontario